Capella is a municipality located in the province of Huesca, Aragon, Spain. According to the 2009 census (INE), the municipality has a population of 382 inhabitants.

Villages
Capella, 312
Llaguarres, 75
Pociello, 17

References

Municipalities in the Province of Huesca